State Highway 3 (SH-3) is a state highway in northern Idaho, connecting U.S. Route 12 near Spalding, east of Lewiston, with Interstate 90 near Rose Lake, east of Coeur d'Alene.

Route description

SH-3's southern terminus is near Arrow Gulch Creek Bridge to the east of Spalding on US 12 on the Nez Perce Indian Reservation in Nez Perce County.  It then heads generally northeast into eastern Latah County, where it leaves the reservation, and continues through Juliaetta and Kendrick, where it intersects SH-99.  It then continues generally north to Deary, where it overlaps SH-8.  The overlapping highways continue east and northeast to Bovill, where they diverge.

SH-3 then continues generally north through Shoshone County, crossing the Saint Maries River, into Benewah County.  It then turns generally northwest to Santa, where it intersects SH-6.

SH-3 then continues generally north to Saint Maries, where it intersects SH-5 before crossing the Saint Joe River and entering the Coeur d'Alene Indian Reservation.  It then continues generally northwest and north past a historical marker for Saint Joseph Indian Mission into Kootenai County.

In Kootenai County, SH-3 continues generally north past an intersection with SH-97 and a historical marker for The Mullan Road, then over Mission Hill Creek Grade and Black Rock Grade before leaving the Coeur d'Alene reservation.  It then turns east and northeast along and across the Coeur d'Alene River to Rose Lake.  It then continues generally northeast and east to the northern terminus, east of the 4th of July Creek Bridge on I-90.

History 

In 2011, the state legislature designated SH-3 as the North Idaho Medal of Honor Highway.

Major intersections

See also

 List of state highways in Idaho
 List of highways numbered 3

References

External links

003
Transportation in Nez Perce County, Idaho
Transportation in Latah County, Idaho
Transportation in Shoshone County, Idaho